Ali Said Raygal is a Somali politician. He is the former Minister of Youth and Sports of the autonomous Somaliland region in northwestern Somalia. Raygal was appointed to the position by the regional president Ahmed Mohamed Mohamoud, following a cabinet reshuffle on 15 March 2012.

References

Living people
Ethnic Somali people
Somalian politicians
Year of birth missing (living people)
People from Hargeisa
Government ministers of Somaliland
Youth and Sports ministers of Somaliland
Resettlement and Rehabilitation ministers of Somaliland